The Church of Our Lady during Childbirth or as it is more popularly known in Maltese as Santa Marija tal-Ħlas, is a 17th-century chapel in the village of Żejtun, Malta.

History
An older chapel used to exist as is mentioned in inquisitor Pietro Dusina's report of his apostolic visit to Malta in 1575. At that time, prior to the formation of the current village of Żejtun, various small hamlets used to exist around small churches. The hamlet of Ħal-Biżbut was built near the chapel of St Mary. In his report, Dusina mentions that he ordered that a statue of Our Lady be placed in the chapel. The present chapel was built on the site of the old chapel in 1682 and the church was used as a burial ground for infants. It was restored in the 19th century. Many of the artwork and artifacts of the old church were transferred to the crypt of the Parish church were they still remain till this day.

References

Żejtun
National Inventory of the Cultural Property of the Maltese Islands
Limestone churches in Malta
Roman Catholic chapels in Malta